Jaimini is a municipality in Baglung district of Gandaki province of Nepal. Nearby cities include Kusma and Baglung. Its geographic coordinates are 28.182101" N 83.613602" E. Jaimini Municipality is surrounded by Parbat district on the east, Galkot Municipality and Bareng Rural Municipality on the west, Khathekhola Rural Municipality and Baglung Municipality on the north and Gulmi and Parbat districts on the south.

References 

Baglung District
Gandaki Province